Spunky may refer to:

Fictional characters
 Spunky (Rocko's Modern Life)
 Spunky, a character from Hunky and Spunky
 Spunky, a character from The Adventures of Spunky and Tadpole
 Spunky, a character from Pac-Mania

Music
 Spunky (Monty Alexander album), 1965
 "Spunky", a song by Bob James from the 1982 album Hands Down
"Spunky", a song by Eels from the 1996 album Beautiful Freak

See also
 Spunk (disambiguation)
Johnny Spunky (b. 1958), Finnish musician, songwriter and author